Solicitor General for New South Wales, known informally as the Solicitor General, is one of the Law Officers of the Crown, and the deputy of the Attorney General.  They can exercise the powers of the Attorney General in the Attorney General's absence. The Solicitor General acts alongside the Crown Advocate, and Crown Solicitor, and serves as one of the legal and constitutional advisers of the Crown and its government in the Australian state of New South Wales.

The Solicitor General is addressed in court as "Mr Solicitor" or "Ms Solicitor". Despite the title, the position is usually held by a barrister, and since 1925 has been a King or Queen's Counsel or Senior Counsel. Previously a political appointment like the Attorney General is today, it has been separate from parliament since 1922  and since 1969 the Solicitor General has been a statutory office connected with the Department of Justice.

History and function
The Solicitor General operates under the provisions of the Solicitor General Act 1969. The retirement age is set at 75. The Solicitor General acts as Counsel for the Crown in the High Court of Australia and other courts, and advises the Attorney General on civil and criminal matters, including issues of constitutional law. Until 1987, the Solicitor General had the power to initiate Crown appeals at the Court of Criminal Appeal in NSW, it then became the responsibility of the Director of Public Prosecutions.

While John Plunkett was the first NSW Barrister to be appointed a Queen's Counsel, this was on 6 June 1856 after he had retired as Attorney General. The first person who was a Queen's Counsel at the time of his appointment as Solicitor General was John Hargrave . Cecil Weigall was appointed Solicitor General in 1922 and appointed King's Counsel in 1925. Harold Snelling  was a Queen's Counsel at the time of his appointment.

Colonial official 
The office of Solicitor General was created in 1824 following the inquiry by John Bigge between 1819 and 1821 into the colonies of NSW and Van Diemen's Land. Bigge's 1823 report on judicial establishments recommended the appointment of a barrister as attorney-general. Bigge set out the primary duty of the attorney-general as being the preparation of indictments and informations and prosecuting them in court. The attorney-general would have discretion whether or not to charge a person. Bigge did not directly recommend the appointment of a solicitor-general, but rather that two English barristers should be encouraged to practice in the colony.

John Stephen was appointed as the first Solicitor-General in August 1824, six months after the appointment of the first Attorney-General, Saxe Bannister. Stephen's role was to assist the Attorney-General as required and cover any absence of the Attorney-General. The duties allocated to Bannister formalised the proposals of Bigge. In addition to the preparation and prosecution of criminal charges, Bannister's duties included acting for the Crown in civil matters, overseeing the preparation of Crown land grants, giving legal advice to the Governor and Government departments and drafting acts, proclamations and Government Orders. The Attorney-General was also considered to have the common law duties and powers exercisable by British Law Officer. The Attorney-General was not appointed to determine small claims, and instead that role that was given to Stephen and in a separate capacity as Commissioner of the Courts of Request. Bannister's salary was £1,200 a year. Stephen received no salary as Solicitor-General, and a salary of £600 a year as Commissioner of the Courts of Request, raised to £800 within a year.

One of the first cases in which Stephen argued as Solicitor-General, saw him appearing for the Magistrates of Sydney in opposition to the Attorney-General concerning trial by jury. D'Arcy Wentworth was one of the leaders of an 1819 petition seeking both trial by jury and the establishment of representative government. Bigge had recommended against trial by a civilian jury, and the House of Commons had narrowly defeated a proposal that juries be introduced for criminal trials, prior to passing the New South Wales Act 1823 which prescribed military juries for criminal trials before the Supreme Court. Bannister advised Governor Brisbane that the establishment of a Court of Quarter Sessions required the same composition as in England, including a civilian jury. Stephens disagreed in a written advice to Wentworth who was one of the Magistrates. Castles describes the case that followed as a fabricated cause, set in train by Wentworth, in which the Attorney-General sought an order requiring the magistrates to assemble juries. Chief Justice Forbes held that civilian juries were required for Court of Quarter Sessions.

In 1828 there was a dispute between Alexander Baxter and John Sampson as to their respective duties. Governor Darling resolved the dispute by making the Attorney General primarily responsible for criminal prosecutions and drafting legislation, while the Solicitor General was primarily responsible for civil matters.

While a Legislative Council was created in 1823 in which all members were appointed, the Attorney-General was not one of the appointed members of the Council until 1829 when Alexander Baxter was appointed. When John Plunkett was promoted to Attorney General in 1836, cost cutting measures meant he was not replaced as Solicitor General. Roger Therry was often Plunkett's junior, including in the Myall Creek massacre trials, although he was never appointed to the role of Solicitor General. The absence of Plunkett from 1841 resulted in Therry being appointed acting Attorney General and William à Beckett as acting Solicitor General. William Manning was the first Solicitor-General to be appointed to the Legislative Council in February 1851.

Political office 
Representative government was introduced in New South Wales in 1856 and the Solicitor General became an official member of the government, one of 5 offices of profit under the Crown that were permitted to be held by a member of the Legislative Assembly. In addition to the work in and out of court, the Solicitor-General took on additional legislative and administrative responsibilities, including representing the government in debates on legal matters and drafting bills. While there were two legal officers in the ministry, there was however only one portfolio, the law officers of the crown, with the Attorney General and Solicitor General jointly responsible for its administration.

In 1873 the Attorney General Edward Butler resigned and the Solicitor General Joseph Innes was promoted to first law officer. Innes was not however replaced as Solicitor General. Instead the Premier Henry Parkes appointed a solicitor, George Allen, to the new  Ministry of Justice and Public Instruction whose responsibilities included the administration of the courts, sheriff and coroner. In 1884 the constitution was amended to remove the dormant office of Solicitor General from the list of paid ministerial offices that could be held by a member of the Legislative Assembly.

The Minister of Justice, Richard O'Connor was temporarily appointed Solicitor General in 1893 to allow him to deputise for the Attorney General while Edmund Barton was visiting Canada. Similarly George Reid was temporarily appointed to the role so that he could deputise for Jack Want while he was away from the colony. This overcame the constitutional limitation that the Attorney General's prerogative powers as first law officer could not be delegated to another minister.

In October 1900 the Secretary of the Attorney-General's department, Hugh Pollock, was appointed to the role. This does not appear to have been controversial at the time with The Evening News describing the appointment as purely a formal one. Pollock was again appointed in July 1901, however on this occasion the appointment was controversial because

 Pollock was a public servant, not a member of parliament and not responsible to parliament;
 While Pollock had been called to the bar in 1890, he had not practised as a barrister and his appointment as the second law officer saw the law almanac list him as second in seniority behind the Attorney General;
 The appointment was at the Governor's pleasure such that the role did not fall with the fall of the government, nor could he be removed from the role by the legislative assembly.

Pollock resigned in October 1904 and was appointed a Crown Prosecutor.

The role was again revived in December 1909 in the Wade ministry. Charles Wade was initially appointed Premier, Attorney General and Minister of Justice, however 2 months later John Garland was appointed to the justice portfolio and as Solicitor General to enable him to assist the Attorney General. Garland was appointed King's Counsel during his term in office. Five months into the McGowan ministry a second public servant, Walter Bevan was appointed to the role. Bevan had been a crown prosecutor for more than 20 years and unlike Pollock, his appointment does not appear to have been controversial, with opposition MLA Gus James describing Bevan as a satisfactory man, well skilled in criminal law. In addition to his principle role in conducting litigation, Bevan was appointed to provide legal advice to the members of the Legislative Council. David Hall was appointed Minister of Justice in April 1912 and it was initially intended that Bevan would retain his role as Solicitor General. Two days later however Hall was appointed to replace Bevan in the role. The role became dormant again in the first Holman ministry when Hall replaced Holman as Attorney General. Holman was briefly appointed to the role in 1915 to deputise for Hall.

The role was revived as a political office in the Holman Nationalist ministry, held in conjunction with the portfolio of Justice and as a separate portfolio in the Storey, first and second Dooley ministries, before being abolished as a political office in the Fuller ministry in 1922.

Public servant 
In 1922 the Attorney General Thomas Bavin was planning to take holidays and Cecil Weigall, the Assistant Law Officer and Crown Prosecutor in the Attorney General's department, was appointed Solicitor General to perform routine statutory duties that would otherwise need to be performed by the Attorney General. Weigall was appointed aged  and went on to serve for more than 30 years, predominantly appearing in criminal prosecutions and appeals. When Weigall retired in 1953 Harold Snelling  was appointed to replace him. Snelling's experience was in civil law rather than criminal, particularly in crown fiscal matters, representing the state in the Supreme Court, High Court and Privy Council. A significant change during the tenure of Snelling was the passage of the Solicitor General Act 1969, which converted the role from a public servant to a statutory office.

Statutory office 
The purpose of making the role a statutory office was to formalise the manner in which the role had been performed since 1922 and to permit the Attorney General to delegate functions and for the Solicitor General to act in the absence of the Attorney General. The bill was not controversial and was supported by the opposition. The act had a number of qualifications to the appointment, including that the person must not be a Minister of the Crown. Initially the person was required to be a Queen's Counsel, however this was removed in 1993 when the appointment of Queen's Counsel was abolished in NSW and instead the person must be "an Australian lawyer of at least 7 years’ standing". Both appointments since 1993 have been Senior Counsel. The retirement age was initially 70, increased to 72 and is currently 75.

Office-holders

Solicitors General, 1824–1922

See also
Solicitor-General of Australia
Solicitor-General of Victoria

Notes

References

External links
NSW Department of Justice